Zadie, Zadi or Zady may refer to:

Places
 Zadié (department), Gabon
 Zadié River, Gabon

People
 Caleb Zady (born 1999), Ivorian footballer
 Guillaume Dah Zadi (born 1978), Ivorian former footballer
 Zadi Diaz, American vlogger, Executive Producer of YouTube Nation
 Zadie Smith (born 1975), English writer

Other uses
 Zadi or Zada (suffix), a Persian and Azerbaijani suffix used as part of titles or nicknames for members of royalty
 Zadie, a Groovy Girls doll